Satyaram Reang (born 1943) is an Indian folk performer and folk artist from Tripura. He is noted for his significant contribution to Hojagiri Dance. In January 2021, he was awarded India's fourth-highest civilian award the Padma Shri in the Arts category. After Thanga Darlong and Benichandra Jamatia, Satyaram Reang became the third renowned person from the indigenous  Tripuri community of Tripura to receive such prestigious award. Reang was also conferred with the Sangeet Natak Akademi Award in 1986.

Awards and recognition 
 Sangeet Natak Akademi Award from Sangeet Natak Akademi, (1986)
 Padma Shri from Government of India, (2021)

See also 

 List of Padma Shri award recipients (2020–2029)

References 

Recipients of the Padma Shri
1943 births
Living people
Tripuri people
People from Tripura
Recipients of the Padma Shri in arts
Recipients of the Sangeet Natak Akademi Award